Cow Run may refer to:

Cow Run, Ohio, an unincorporated community
Cow Run (Little Muskingum River), a stream in Ohio
Cow Run (West Virginia), a stream